Ha Ha Tonka is an American band originally formed in West Plains, Missouri, United States, and currently signed to Bloodshot Records out of Chicago, Illinois. The band is named after Ha Ha Tonka State Park in Camdenton, Missouri.

About 
After signing to Bloodshot Records, Buckle in the Bible Belt was released on September 11, 2007. "St. Nick on the Fourth in a Fervor" released as the first single from that album.

The band's website says that their "dark view of the realities of socio-economic hardship, backwoods prejudices and drug abuse is leavened by wry humor and a deep appreciation for regional storytelling traditions." The lead singer, Brian Roberts, is a cancer survivor who criticizes the American health care system in "This Is Not a Cure for the Common Cold". One reviewer stated that "Ha Ha Tonka make the kind of roots rock that fits the mood of America in the summer of 2008. It's restless, edgy and increasingly willing to address the dark side of This Land."

Discography

Studio albums 
 2007: Buckle in the Bible Belt (Bloodshot Records re-release)
 2009: Novel Sounds of the Nouveau South (Bloodshot Records)
 2011: Death of a Decade (Bloodshot Records)
 2013: Lessons (Bloodshot Records)
 2017: Heart-Shaped Mountain (Bloodshot Records)

References

External links

 Ha Ha Tonka Music
 Ha Ha Tonka at Bloodshot Records

Indie rock musical groups from Missouri
Bloodshot Records artists